1914 in sports describes the year's events in world sport.

American football
College championship
 College football national championship – Army Cadets
Professional championships  
 Ohio League champions – Akron Parratt's Indians  
Events  
 15 November — Harry Turner, of the Canton Professionals, becomes the first player to die from game-related injuries in the "Ohio League", the direct predecessor to the National Football League.

Association football
Brazil
 Formation of the Brazilian Football Confederation (Confederação Brasileira de Futebol or CBF)
 Sociedade Esportiva Palmeiras officially founded in São Paulo on August 26.
England
 The Football League – Blackburn Rovers 51 points, Aston Villa 44, Middlesbrough 43, Oldham Athletic 43, West Bromwich Albion 43, Bolton Wanderers 42
 FA Cup final – Burnley 1–0 Liverpool at Crystal Palace, London
Germany
 National Championship – SpVgg Fürth (2–2) 3–2 VfB Leipzig at Magdeburg 
Portugal
 Formation in Lisbon of the Portuguese Football Federation (Federação Portuguesa de Futebol or FPF)
Scotland
 Scottish Football League – Celtic
 Scottish Cup final – Celtic 4–1 Hibernian at Ibrox Park (replay following 0–0 draw)

Australian rules football
VFL Premiership
 26 September – Carlton wins the 18th VFL Premiership, defeating South Melbourne 6.9 (45) to 4.15 (39) in the 1914 VFL Grand Final
South Australian Football League
 19 September – Port Adelaide 13.15 (93) defeats North Adelaide 1.8 (14) for their second successive SAFL flag and eighth overall
 Magarey Medal won by Jack Ashley (Port Adelaide)
West Australian Football League
 10 October – East Fremantle 5.13 (43) defeats South Fremantle 3.6 (24) for its ninth WAFL premiership.
Events
 University withdraws from the VFL at the end of the season
 Port Adelaide become the only SAFA/SAFL/SANFL team to finish with a perfect season, overall winning thirty consecutive matches including one against a combined team from the other six SAFL clubs and one against Carlton.

Bandy
Sweden
 Championship final – AIK 4–2 Djurgårdens IF

Baseball
World Series
 9–13 October — Boston Braves (NL) defeats Philadelphia Athletics (AL) to win the 1914 World Series by 4 games to 0
Events
 The "Federal League War" ensues when the Federal League leaves Minor League Baseball and competes with the two established major leagues.  Retaining clubs in Kansas City, Indianapolis, St Louis, Chicago and Pittsburgh, the Federal League sets up additional clubs in Buffalo, Baltimore and Brooklyn.
 Baltimore Terrapins are a great popular success and drive the minor Orioles out of business, so creating the basis of the baseball anti–trust case
 22 April — Babe Ruth pitches his first professional game for the Baltimore Orioles at age 19

Boxing
Events
 Jack Johnson spends the year moving from one country to another but stages exhibition fights as far afield as Gothenburg and Buenos Aires.  In June, he defends his world heavyweight title against Frank Moran in Paris and wins over 20 rounds.
 1 to 24 January — Danish boxer Waldemar Holberg defeats Ray Bronson over 20 rounds in Melbourne and claims the vacant World Welterweight Championship.  Just 23 days later, Holberg loses the title to Tom McCormick after a sixth round foul, also at Melbourne.
 21 March — McCormick loses the welterweight title to Matt Wells over 20 rounds at Sydney.
 30 March — a World Flyweight Championship (108 lb to 112 lb) is proposed for the first time after Jimmy Wilde defeats Eugene Husson in London.  Wilde, subsequently ranked by most experts as the greatest-ever flyweight, holds the title until 1923.
 7 April — Al McCoy defeats George Chip with a surprise first-round knockout in Brooklyn, New York, to take the World Middleweight Championship. McCoy holds the title until 1917.
 With a series of wins from April to November, Jack Dillon resolves the long-standing issue of the vacant World Light Heavyweight Championship in his favour.  He defeats Battling Levinsky, Bob Moha, Frank Mantell and Charley Weinert to claim the title, which he holds until 1916.
 3 June — Kid Williams defeats Johnny Coulon by a third-round knockout at Vernon, California, to win the World Bantamweight Championship.  Williams holds the title until 1917.
 7 July — Freddie Welsh defeats Willie Ritchie over 20 rounds in London to win the World Lightweight Championship.  Welsh holds the title until 1917.
Lineal world champions
 World Heavyweight Championship – Jack Johnson
 World Light Heavyweight Championship – vacant → Jack Dillon
 World Middleweight Championship – George Chip → Al McCoy
 World Welterweight Championship – vacant → Waldemar Holberg → Tom McCormick → Matt Wells
 World Lightweight Championship – Willie Ritchie → Freddie Welsh
 World Featherweight Championship – Johnny Kilbane
 World Bantamweight Championship – Johnny Coulon → Kid Williams
 World Flyweight Championship – Jimmy Wilde

Canadian football
Grey Cup
 6th Grey Cup – Toronto Argonauts 14–2 University of Toronto Varsity Blues

Cricket
Events
 The 1914 English cricket season is cancelled at the end of August because of the outbreak of the First World War.  The last four matches to be played all finish on 2 September and the remaining five scheduled fixtures are cancelled.
England
 County Championship – Surrey
 Minor Counties Championship – undecided
 Most runs – Jack Hobbs 2697 @ 58.63 (HS 226)
 Most wickets – Colin Blythe 170 @ 15.19 (BB 9–97)
 Wisden Cricketers of the Year – Johnny Douglas, Percy Fender, Wally Hardinge, Donald Knight, Sydney Smith 
Australia
 Sheffield Shield – New South Wales
 Most runs – Charlie Macartney 892 @ 111.50 (HS 201)  
 Most wickets – Charles Kelleway 45 @ 12.68 (BB 7–35)
India
 Bombay Quadrangular – Hindus shared with Muslims
New Zealand
 Plunket Shield – Canterbury
South Africa
 Currie Cup – Western Province
West Indies
 Inter-Colonial Tournament – not contested

Cycling
Tour de France
 Philippe Thys (Belgium) wins the 12th Tour de France

Figure skating
World Figure Skating Championships
 World Men's Champion – Gosta Sandahl (Sweden)
 World Women's Champion – Opika von Méray Horváth (Hungary)
 World Pairs Champions – Ludowika Jakobsson-Eilers / Walter Jakobsson (Finland)

Golf
Major tournaments
 British Open – Harry Vardon
 US Open – Walter Hagen
Other tournaments
 British Amateur – J L C Jenkins
 US Amateur – Francis Ouimet

Horse racing
England
 Grand National – Sunloch
 1,000 Guineas Stakes – Princess Dorrie
 2,000 Guineas Stakes – Kennymore
 The Derby – Durbar
 The Oaks – Princess Dorrie
 St. Leger Stakes – Black Jester
Australia
 Melbourne Cup – Kingsburgh
Canada
 King's Plate – Beehive
Ireland
 Irish Grand National – Civil War
 Irish Derby Stakes – Land of Song
USA
 Kentucky Derby – Old Rosebud 
 Preakness Stakes – Holiday
 Belmont Stakes – Luke McLuke

Ice hockey
Stanley Cup
 Toronto Blueshirts wins the National Hockey Association (NHA) championship and their first Stanley Cup.
Events
 Victoria Aristocrats wins the Pacific Coast Hockey Association (PCHA) championship
 Blueshirts play Aristocrats in a challenge series with Blueshirts winning by three games to nil. The NHA and PCHA agree to start an annual playoff in 1915 to decide the Stanley Cup winner.
 Regina Victorias wins the Allan Cup

Motorsport

Rowing
The Boat Race
 28 March — Cambridge wins the 71st Oxford and Cambridge Boat Race

Rugby league
International
1914 Great Britain Lions tour of Australia and New Zealand
England
 Championship – Salford 
 Challenge Cup final – Hull F.C. 6–0 Wakefield Trinity at Thrum Hall, Halifax 
 Lancashire League Championship – Wigan
 Yorkshire League Championship – Huddersfield
 Lancashire County Cup – Oldham 5–0 Wigan
 Yorkshire County Cup – Huddersfield 19–3 Bradford Northern
Australia
 NSW Premiership – South Sydney (outright winner)
New Zealand
1914 New Zealand rugby league season

Rugby union
Five Nations Championship
 32nd Five Nations Championship series is won by England who complete the Grand Slam

Speed skating
Speed Skating World Championships
 Men's All-round Champion – Oscar Mathisen (Norway)

Tennis
Australia
 Australian Men's Singles Championship – Arthur O'Hara Wood (Australia) defeats Gerald Patterson (Australia) 6–4 6–3 5–7 6–1
England
 Wimbledon Men's Singles Championship – Norman Brookes (Australia) defeats Anthony Wilding (New Zealand) 6–4 6–4 7–5
 Wimbledon Women's Singles Championship – Dorothea Douglass Lambert Chambers (GB) defeats Ethel Thomson Larcombe (GB) 7–5 6–4
France
 French Men's Singles Championship – Max Decugis (France) defeats Jean Samazeuilh (France) 3–6 6–1 6–4 6–4
 French Women's Singles Championship – Marguerite Broquedis (France) defeats Suzanne Lenglen (France) 5–7 6–4 6–3
USA
 American Men's Singles Championship – Richard Norris Williams (USA) defeats Maurice McLoughlin (USA) 6–3 8–6 10–8
 American Women's Singles Championship – Mary Browne (USA) defeats Marie Wagner (USA) 6–2 1–6 6–1
Davis Cup
 1914 International Lawn Tennis Challenge –  3–2  at West Side Tennis Club (grass) New York City, United States

Yacht racing
 1914 America's Cup – Resolute competes against the Vanitie but the race is cancelled due to the onset of World War I.

References

 
Sports by year